(Old Norse: , "strength"), sometimes anglicized as Thrúd or Thrud, is a daughter of the major god Thor and the goddess Sif in Norse mythology. Þrúðr is also the name of one of the valkyries who serve ale to the einherjar in Valhalla (Grímnismál, stanza 36). The two may or may not be the same figure.

Attestations
Þrúðr is attested in the following sources:

Poetic Edda
The Poetic Edda poem Alvíssmál, in which a dwarf, Alvíss, claims to be engaged to Thor's daughter, may be about Þrúðr, but the daughter is not named.

Prose Edda
The Prose Edda book Skáldskaparmál (4) tells that Thor can be referred to by the kenning "father of Þrúðr" (faðir Þrúðar). Eysteinn Valdason uses it in his poem about Thor (2). The Skáldskaparmál (21) adds that her mother is Sif.

In Bragi Boddason's Ragnarsdrápa, the jötunn Hrungnir is called "thief of Þrúðr" (Þrúðar þjófr). But there is no direct reference to this myth in any other source. Skáldskaparmál (17), in which Snorri relates the fight between Thor and Hrungnir, mentions a very different cause, and Þjóðólfr of Hvinir's Haustlöng only describes the fight without giving the reason for it. This poem depicts two mythological scenes painted on a shield, the first being Iðunn's abduction by the giant Þjazi. Margaret Clunies Ross suggested that the two episodes might be complementary, both dealing with the abduction of a goddess by a giant, its failure and the death of the abductor. Another kenning may allude to this myth: in Eilífr Goðrúnarson's Þórsdrápa (18), Thor is called "he who longs fiercely for Þrúðr" (þrámóðnir Þrúðar).

Karlevi Runestone

Þrúðr is mentioned on the 10th-century Karlevi runestone on the island of Öland, Sweden, where a chieftain is referred to as the "tree of Þrúðr".

Kennings
The name Þrúðr could be used in kennings for chieftains, as exemplified on the Karlevi Runestone. The name is also used in kennings for women. For instance, Ormr Steinþórsson in his poem about a woman (4) uses the kenning , which, according to Anthony Faulkes, can be rendered "keeper of the malt-box (mash-tub) or ale-vessel".

See also
Þrúðvangr, the field of Thor
Torunn, the daughter of Thor in the Marvel Comics universe
Drude
Trude
Trudy
Alvíss

Notes

References

 Clunies Ross, Margaret (1994). Prolonged Echoes. Old Norse Myths in medieval Northern Society. Vol. 1: The myths. Odense: Odense University Press. The Viking Collection; vol. 7. .
 Faulkes, Anthony (1998), edition of: Snorri Sturluson. Edda. Skáldskaparmál. 2. Glossary and Index of Names. London: Viking Society for Northern Research. .
 Lindow, John (2001). Norse Mythology: A Guide to the Gods, Heroes, Rituals, and Beliefs. Oxford University Press. .
 Rundata 2.0 for Windows.
 Simek, Rudolf (1987). Dictionary of Northern Mythology. Translated by Angela Hall. Cambridge: D. S. Brewer, 1996. .

Valkyries
Ásynjur